is a Japanese professional boxer who has held the WBO Asia Pacific flyweight title since 2020. As of December 2021, he is ranked as the world's tenth best flyweight by The Ring.

Professional boxing career
Yamauchi made his professional debut against Supaluek Noiwaengphim on 30 June 2017, whom he beat by a second-round knockout. Yamauchi next fought the journeyman Lester Abutan on 19 December 2017. He won the fight by a fourth-round technical knockout.

Yamauchi was scheduled to fight Yota Hori on May 7, 2018, in his third professional appearance. He won the fight by a fifth-round technical knockout. Yamauchi next fought Rio Nainggolan on 1 October 2018, and won by a third-round stoppage, as Nainggolan retired from the fight at the end of the round.

Yamauchi was scheduled to fight Wulan Tuolehazi for the vacant WBA International flyweight title on 30 March 2019. It was his first professional title fight, his first twelve-round fight, as well as his first fight outside of Japan. Yamauchi suffered his first professional defeat, as Tuolehazi won the fight by unanimous decision. Yamauchi was next scheduled to face the WBA Asian flyweight champion, and #13 ranked WBA flyweight conteder, Alphoe Dagayloan on 23 August 2019. He won the fight by majority decision. Yamauchi faced another Philippine opponent, MJ Bo, on 14 February 2020. He won the fight by a second-round knockout.

Yamauchi was booked to fight his fellow countryman Satoru Todaka for the vacant WBO Asia Pacific flyweight title on 19 August 2020. Todaka retired from the bout at the end of the third round. Yamauchi made his first title defense against Yuta Nakayama on 24 June 2021. He won the fight by a seventh-round technical knockout.

Yamauchi challenged the reigning WBO flyweight champion Junto Nakatani, in what was Nakatani's second title defense. The title fight was scheduled for the undercard of the Ryota Murata and Gennadiy Golovkin middleweight unification bout, which took  place on 9 April 2022 at the Saitama Super Arena in Saitama, Japan. He lost the fight by an eight-round technical knockout, due to referee stoppage, after having lost all the preceding rounds on the judges' scorecards.

Professional boxing record

References

1995 births
Living people
Sportspeople from Osaka Prefecture
Japanese male boxers
Flyweight boxers
Southpaw boxers